Robert Willoughby may refer to:
 Robert Willoughby, 1st Baron Willoughby de Broke (1452–1502), one of the chief commanders against the Cornish rebels for Henry VII
 Robert Willoughby, 2nd Baron Willoughby de Broke (1472–1521), English peer
 Robert Willoughby, 6th Baron Willoughby de Eresby (c.1385 – 1452), English baron and soldier in the Hundred Years' War
 Robert Hugh Willoughby (1921–2018), American flute player and teacher